HD 126614 Ab, or simply HD 126614 b, (also known as HIP 70623 b) is an extrasolar planet which orbits the primary K-type star HD 126614 A, located approximately 240 light years away in the constellation Virgo. It was discovered on November 13, 2009. However, this planet has a highly eccentric orbit around its parent star. The planetary distance ranges from 0.94 AU to 3.61 AU.
HD 126614 A also has the highest metallicity of any star hosting any exoplanets, at +0.56 dex.

In 2022, the true mass and inclination of HD 126614 Ab were measured via astrometry.

See also
Other planets that were discovered or confirmed on November 13, 2009:
 HD 34445 b
 HD 13931 b
 Gliese 179 b
 QS Virginis b

References

 

Exoplanets discovered in 2009
Exoplanets detected by radial velocity
Exoplanets detected by astrometry
Giant planets
Virgo (constellation)